Yaxley and Farcet railway station is a former station in Yaxley, Cambridgeshire, just south of Peterborough.

History
The station was opened by the Great Northern Railway on 19 May 1890, originally being named Yaxley; just over five years later, in July 1895, it was renamed Yaxley and Farcet.

The station was closed for passengers on 6 April 1959.

Route

References

External links
 Yaxley and Farcet station on navigable 1946 O. S. map
 Webpage with photograph of Yaxley and Farcet station

Disused railway stations in Cambridgeshire
Former Great Northern Railway stations
Railway stations in Great Britain opened in 1890
Railway stations in Great Britain closed in 1959
railway station